Keewatin is a city in Itasca County, Minnesota, United States.  The population was 1,068 at the 2010 census.

U.S. Highway 169 serves as a main route in Keewatin. Students from the Keewatin area attend Nashwauk Keewatin High School.

Geography

Demographics

2012 census
As of the census of 2012, there were 1,064 people, 475 households, and 265 families living in the city. The racial makeup of the city was 95.8% White, 0.5% African American, 1.3% Native American, 0.2% Asian, 0.1% from other races, and 2.2% from two or more races. Hispanic or Latino of any race were 0.3% of the population.

There were 475 households, of which 29.3% had children under the age of 18 living with them, 37.7% were married couples living together, 12.0% had a female householder with no husband present, 6.1% had a male householder with no wife present, and 44.2% were non-families. 37.5% of all households were made up of individuals, and 12% had someone living alone who was 65 years of age or older. The average household size was 2.25 and the average family size was 2.94.

The median age in the city was 39.9 years. 23.2% of residents were under the age of 18; 8.4% were between the ages of 18 and 24; 24.1% were from 25 to 44; 30.1% were from 45 to 64; and 14.1% were 65 years of age or older. The gender makeup of the city was 51.5% male and 48.5% female.

2000 census
As of the census of 2000, there were 1,164 people, 522 households, and 306 families living in the city. The racial makeup of the city was 97.77% White, 0.34% African American, 0.34% Native American, 0.43% Asian, 0.09% from other races, and 1.03% from two or more races. Hispanic or Latino of any race were 0.09% of the population.

There were 522 households, out of which 27.4% had children under the age of 18 living with them, 44.1% were married couples living together, 10.7% had a female householder with no husband present, and 41.2% were non-families. 36.4% of all households were made up of individuals, and 17.6% had someone living alone who was 65 years of age or older.  The average household size was 2.23 and the average family size was 2.92.

In the city, the population was spread out, with 25.3% under the age of 18, 8.4% from 18 to 24, 26.4% from 25 to 44, 22.3% from 45 to 64, and 17.7% who were 65 years of age or older.  The median age was 38 years. For every 100 females, there were 97.6 males.  For every 100 females age 18 and over, there were 91.2 males.

The median income for a household in the city was $28,795, and the median income for a family was $34,688. Males had a median income of $32,961 versus $20,536 for females. The per capita income for the city was $15,066.  About 11.8% of families and 13.7% of the population were below the poverty line, including 14.9% of those under age 18 and 11.2% of those age 65 or over.

Economy
Located to the north, U.S. Steel operates the  Keewatin taconite or Keetac mines.

Notable people
John Anderson – Head coach of the University of Minnesota Golden Gophers baseball team.
Gino Cappelletti (1934-2022) - Professional football player, most notably with the New England Patriots

References

Cities in Minnesota
Cities in Itasca County, Minnesota